Heimatschutz Architecture, or the Heimatschutzstil ("Homeland Protection Style") or Heimatstil (the latter term is not to be confused with Heimatstil in the sense of late historicism) is a style of architectural modernism that was first described in 1904 and had its prime until 1945. Various buildings were built after the war until around 1960. The main areas of work were settlement building, house building, garden design, industrial building, church building and monument preservation.

The style is closely linked to the various social movements influenced by neo-romantic ideals which aim to strengthen a true love for the homeland (Heimat) but also a romantic nationalism. In opposition to the urbanization in the wake of the Industrial Revolution, their efforts resulted in the birth of numerous associations of history of popular traditions, notably the Wandervogel founded in 1901.

Description 

The Heimatschutzstil or Heimatstil was "an architecture on the way to modernity rooted in local and regional building traditions and overcoming historicism and Art Nouveau." Due to its turn away from the previously dominant historicism that copied the “foreign,” it was seen as a reform style. Externally identifying parts or elements are the use of building materials customary in the area (e.g. brick in northern Germany, wood in the Alpine region) and, in contrast to historicism, a renunciation of decorative attributes that imitate older architectural styles in great detail. Elements of traditional architecture, such as arches or columns, could be used in a reduced form. It also uses ornamental elements from the past, such as turrets, pillars or cherubs, and is part of the cultural landscape.

Although it appeared at the turn of the century, it mainly began to be deployed in East Prussia, after the destruction of the First World War, with the support of organizations such as the Reichsverband Ostpreußenhilfe (Reich Association of East Prussia Aid), but also in Bavaria with the construction of a network of new post offices. Although the buildings want to be embedded in a traditional setting, they are often captivating with their size and purity of style.

History 
The ancestor of the modern Heimatschutz architecture is the brick architecture of the early industrial era. This style can be found in both sacred and secular architecture, but also in monumental sculpture and garden art.

On 30 March 1904 the Deutsche Bund für Heimatschutz (German Association of Homeland Security) was founded in Dresden under the aegis of the ecologist Ernst Rudorff (1840–1916). Its main focus was on architecture, especially building maintenance, with the aim of reviving the old design language and promoting traditional building methods and craftsmanship. In the time of National Socialism, Heimatschutz architecture was preferred, especially in the area of residential construction. In settlement construction, one of the main fields of homeland security, uniform standard buildings were usually erected, which at best had regional elements in the decoration. Representative public buildings, however, were executed in the style of monumental neoclassicism.

After 1945 the importance of this architectural style decreased for a number of reasons. For one, it was expensive; for another, it was superseded by advances in construction technology and, as a result, new architectural forms; and finally, it experienced a politicization in the post-war competition for planning contracts and the filling of public offices, because to some urban planners it did not seem to be clearly distinguishable from construction methods favored by National Socialists like Hanns Dustmann. Some examples of Heimatschutz architecture are more closely related to the brick expressionism of Fritz Höger, who hardly received any commissions between 1933 and 1945. Until around 1960, various ensembles in the Heimatschutz style were built, such as the Freudenstadt Marktplatz from 1950 and the Prinzipalmarkt in Münster, which was rebuilt between 1947 and 1958 in a typical regional way, but not true to the original.

In Switzerland there were several phases of the home style. After the first phase, which lasted until the First World War, it returned in the 1920s as the “Second Home Style” and in the 1940s as the “Landistil” in modified new editions. The “regionalism” of the present is also based on the Heimat style.

Major Designers to use Heimatschutz Architecture 

 Josef Anton Albrich
 Albert Boßlet
 Otto Bubenzer
 Adalbert Erlebach
 Roderich Fick
 Theodor Fischer
 Hans Foschum
 Karl Gruber
 Peter Klotzbach
 Rudolph Lempp
 Alfred Lichtwark
 Stephan Mattar
 Architekturbüro Mattar & Scheler
 Hermann Muthesius
 Ernst Prinz
 Heinrich Renard
 Hans Roß
 Paul Schmitthenner
 Julius Schulte-Frohlinde
 Paul Schultze-Naumburg
 Ludwig Schweizer

Gallery

Further reading
 Hans-Günther Andresen: Bauen in Backstein. Schleswig-Holsteinische Heimatschutz-Architektur zwischen Tradition und Reform. Zur Ausstellung der Schleswig-Holsteinischen Landesbibliothek vom 2. Juli bis 27. August 1989. (Boyens, Heide, 1989), .
 Bayerischer Landesverein für Heimatschutz e.V., Richtpunkte für das Bauen im Sinne des Heimatschutzes. (Munich, 1929).
 Elisabeth Crettaz-Stürzel, Heimatstil. Reformarchitektur in der Schweiz 1896–1914. (Huber, Frauenfeld, 2005), .
 
 Sabine Fechter, Heimatschutzbauten in Mainfranken. Entwicklungen und Wandlungen von Baupflege 1900–1975. (Bad Windsheim, 2006), .
 Marco Kieser, Heimatschutzarchitektur im Wiederaufbau des Rheinlandes. In: Beiträge zur Heimatpflege im Rheinland 4 (Cologne, 1998).
 Winfried Nerdinger (Hrsg.), Bauen im Nationalsozialismus. Bayern 1933–1945. (Munich, 1993), .
 Christian F. Otto, "Modern Environment and Historical Continuity: The Heimatschutz Discourse in Germany," in Art Journal 43, no. 2 (1983): 148–57. 
 Ernst Rudorff: Heimatschutz. 3 vols. (Berlin, 1904).
 Isabel Termini: Heimat bauen. Aspekte zu Heimat – Heimatschutz – Heimatstil – Heimatschutzarchitektur. (Universität Wien, Diplom-Arbeit, 2001).

References

External links 

(In German):
 Denkmalpflege und Baugeschichte – Heimatschutzarchitektur
 Gesellschaft für Schleswig-Holsteinische Geschichte: Heimatschutzarchitektur in Schleswig-Holstein
 Heimatstil in der Schweiz (PDF-Datei; 57 kB)
 Der Schweizer Heimatschutz, Nonprofit-Organisation im Bereich Baukultur 
 Der Lebensweg Fritz Högers (PDF; 107 kB) in Verb. mit Much, Bröcker, Lichtwark

Architectural styles
20th-century architecture
20th-century architecture in Austria
Central European culture
Nazism